Arts Council Napa Valley (ACNV) is the officially designated local arts agency (LAA) for Napa County, California. Established in 1963, it became a 501(c)3 nonprofit organization in 1981. ACNV advances the arts in Napa County through diverse cultural programs and community services responding to its three core initiatives: Cultural Marketing, Art in Public Spaces, and Arts in Education.

PROGRAMS & SERVICES
Artist Opportunities
Arts in April™
Arts Education
ART ON F1RST
Napa ARTwalk Public Sculpture Tour
Napa Valley Collection™
Master Arts & Culture Event Calendar
Napa County Poet Laureate
Online Artist Registry
Poetry Out Loud

Arts Council Napa Valley is in part funded by the California state arts council, the California Arts Council (CAC), the Hewlett Foundation, Napa Valley Community Foundation, and James Irvine Foundation, in addition to private donors.

External links
Arts Council of Napa Valley website

Napa County, California
Napa